True Self is the fourth studio album by American rock band SOiL, first released in the U.S. on May 2, 2006. It is the band's first album with new vocalist A.J. Cavalier, former member of World in Pain and Diesel Machine, and their last album to feature rhythm guitarist Shaun Glass. The album was leaked onto P2P and BitTorrent sites on March 4, almost two months before its official release. The album sold 4,000 copies in the U.S. during its first week of release.

A music video was filmed for "Give It Up" and released shortly before the album.

In promotion of the album, Soil did a European/US tour with Staind, US tours with Sevendust, 10 Years and Godsmack, as well as numerous UK and European festival and headline tours. Soil ended the cycle with their summer 2007 True Rock tour.

Track listing
All tracks were recorded at Bombshelter Studios in Los Angeles, California, except Give It Up, Hear Me, Until It's Over and Jaded, which were recorded at Glenwood Studios, Burbank, California.

Personnel

SOiL
 AJ Cavalier – lead vocals
 Adam Zadel – lead guitar, backing vocals
 Shaun Glass – rhythm guitar
 Tim King – bass guitar
 Tom Schofield – drums

Other 
 Wayne Static – guest vocals on "Give It Up"
 Burton C. Bell – guest vocals on "Forever Dead"
 Stephen Jensen – art director, designer, photographer
 Shaun Nowotnik – assistant to Stephen Jensen
 Brian Vecchione – band photography
 Ulrich Wild – producer, engineer, mixer
 Ted Jensen – mastering

References

External links
 "Give It Up" music video

2006 albums
Soil (American band) albums
DRT Entertainment albums
Albums produced by Ulrich Wild